Phytomyza solidaginivora is a species of leaf miner flies (insects in the family Agromyzidae).

References

Phytomyza
Articles created by Qbugbot
Insects described in 1969